Blase is an unincorporated community in St. Charles County, in the U.S. state of Missouri.

History
A variant name was "Blaze". The community was named after one Mr. Blaze, the original owner of the site.

References

Unincorporated communities in St. Charles County, Missouri
Unincorporated communities in Missouri